Mathias Yohannes (born January 19, 2004) is an American soccer player who plays as a midfielder for Loudoun United as a member of the D.C. United youth academy.

Career

Loudoun United
In February 2021, Yohannes began training with D.C. United's USL Championship affiliate, Loudoun United. He made his professional debut on July 4, 2021, coming on as a 75th-minute substitute for Massimo Ferrin in a 2-0 defeat to Hartford Athletic.

Career statistics

Club

References

External links

2004 births
Living people
Loudoun United FC players
USL Championship players
American soccer players
Association football midfielders
People from Chantilly, Virginia
Soccer players from Virginia